George Henry Marten  (20 January 1876 – 13 January 1966) was an Anglican priest: he was the Archdeacon of Kingston-upon-Thames from 1931 until 1946.

Marten was educated at Clifton College and King's College, Cambridge  and ordained in 1900. Following  curacies at Holy Trinity, Southwark and St Peter, Limpsfield he was successively Vicar of St Marks, Woodcote, Purley, Rural Dean of Caterham, Vicar of St Marks with St Andrews, Surbiton and Rector of Godstone.

References

1876 births
People educated at Clifton College
Alumni of King's College, Cambridge
Archdeacons of Kingston upon Thames
1966 deaths